Eve is Over the Rhine's third studio album, released in 1994, and the band's final release on I.R.S. Records. All songs produced and arranged by Over the Rhine. The album was recorded and mixed by Trina Shoemaker. Tracks 3, 8, 9 and 12 were recorded and mixed by Gene Eugene, listed as Gene Andrusco. Track 6 was recorded by Trina, mixed by Gene.

Track listing
Happy With Myself?
Within Without
Should
Conjectures Of A Guilty Bystander
Melancholy Room
Sleep Baby Jane
Daddy Untwisted
Birds
June
My Love Is A Fever
Falling (Death Of A Tree)
Bothered (hidden track)

Personnel
Karin Bergquist - vocals, acoustic guitar on "Happy With Myself"
Ric Hordinski - acoustic and electric guitars, lap steel
Brian Kelley - drums and percussion
Linford Detweiler - bass and keyboard instruments

Additional personnel
Chris Dahlgren - upright bass on "Bothered"
Bill Dillon - additional guitars on "Falling (Death Of A Tree)"

References

Over the Rhine (band) albums
1994 albums